The 62nd Massachusetts Volunteer Infantry Regiment was an infantry regiment being raised to serve in the Union Army during the American Civil War. The war ended before the unit was complete.

History
Returning from his command of the 60th Massachusetts Infantry, Colonel Ansel D Wass began to raise another infantry regiment at Readville, Massachusetts for one year's service. With the last companies of the 61st Massachusetts Infantry leaving camp in early March 1865, new recruits began forming another regiment. Between March and 11 April 1865, four companies had been mustered in when General Lee's surrender stopped the organization. The volunteers remained in camp until 5 May, when they were mustered out of service.

Casualties
From a complement of 405 men, two died from disease, while eight others deserted.

See also
List of Massachusetts Civil War Units
Massachusetts in the American Civil War

Notes

References

External links
62nd Regiment, Massachusetts Infantry

Units and formations of the Union Army from Massachusetts
1865 establishments in Massachusetts
Military units and formations established in 1865
Military units and formations disestablished in 1865